John Burghill (died 1414) was a medieval Bishop of Llandaff and Bishop of Coventry and Lichfield.

Burghill was nominated to Llandaff on 12 April 1396, and consecrated around 10 July 1396. He was translated to Coventry and Lichfield on 2 July 1398.

Burghill died as Bishop of Coventry and Lichfield about 27 May 1414.

Citations

References
 

14th-century English Roman Catholic bishops
15th-century English Roman Catholic bishops
Bishops of Lichfield
Bishops of Llandaff
1414 deaths
Year of birth unknown